Rostøya or Rostøy is an island in Austevoll municipality in Vestland county, Norway. It is located north of the island of Drøna and west of the island of Huftarøy.

See also
List of islands of Norway

References

Islands of Vestland
Austevoll